Wangjing Station is an interchange station between Line 14 and Line 15 of the Beijing Subway. It is located in the Wangjing subdistrict of Chaoyang, a residential area.

Station layout
Both the line 14 and line 15 stations have underground island platforms.

Exits
There are 4 exits, lettered A, C, F, and H. Exits A and F are accessible.

Gallery

References

External links

Beijing Subway stations in Chaoyang District
Railway stations in China opened in 2010